Luba may refer to:

Geography 
Kingdom of Luba, a pre-colonial Central African empire
Ľubá, a village and municipality in the Nitra region of south-west Slovakia
Luba, Abra, a municipality in the Philippines
Luba, Equatorial Guinea, a town on the island of Bioko

People 
 Luba (given name), a Slavic feminine given name
Luba (singer) (born 1958), Canadian music artist of Ukrainian descent
Luba (EP), a 1982 extended play album by Canadian singer Luba
Luba people, an ethnic group in Central Africa, mostly in the Democratic Republic of the Congo

Other 
Luba (comics), a comic book character created by Los Bros Hernandez
Luba Group, a Dutch staffing company
Luba-Kasai language (aka Tshiluba)
 Missa Luba, a musical setting of the Latin Mass made by Luba people and recorded in 1958 by Les Troubadours du Roi Bauduoin

Language and nationality disambiguation pages